HMAS Cerberus is the name given to a number of Royal Australian Navy ships and shore establishments, after the mythological Cerberus.

 was a breastwork monitor that was transferred from the Victorian Naval Forces to the Commonwealth Naval Forces in 1901, and the Royal Australian Navy in 1911. She was decommissioned in 1921 and disposed of in 1924.
 is the former Flinders Naval Depot which was renamed HMAS Cerberus in 1921 and is the Royal Australian Navy's primary training establishment, located at Crib Point on the Mornington Peninsula, south of Melbourne, Victoria.

The Cerberus name was also given to a number of subsidiary depots and auxiliary vessels. These units were identified with Roman numerals.
HMAS Cerberus II was the gunboat , renamed on 1 April 1921 as Cerberus II until reverting to Protector in 1924
HMAS Cerberus III, the Naval Reserve Depot at Port Melbourne, was commissioned as HMAS Lonsdale on 1 August 1940
HMAS Cerberus III was the tug Kooronga
HMAS Cerberus IV the Naval Reserve Depot at Port Adelaide, was commissioned as HMAS Torrens (naval base) on 1 August 1940
HMAS Cerberus IV was the tug TB 10
HMAS Cerberus V, the Naval Reserve Depot at Fremantle, was commissioned  on 1 August 1940
HMAS Cerberus V was the tug TB 1536 Dooen transferred from the Australian Army in 1958
HMAS Cerberus VI was the naval depot in Hobart; later renamed HMAS Derwent, then 

Royal Australian Navy ship names